Lopatnikovo is a rural locality (a village) in Mardengskoye Rural Settlement, Velikoustyugsky District, Vologda Oblast, Russia. The population was 18 as of 2002.

Geography 
Lopatnikovo is located 13 km west of Veliky Ustyug (the district's administrative centre) by road. Ogoryltsevo is the nearest rural locality.

References 

Rural localities in Velikoustyugsky District